Herbert Michael Gilles  (10 September 1921 – 20 October 2015) was a Maltese-British physician and professor of tropical medicine, recognized as a leading expert in his field.

Early life, education and military service
Gilles was born to Maltese parents (the family name was originally Galea) living in Port Said, Egypt, and went to a French school there until the age of 11.  He then became a boarding school student for his secondary education at St. Edward's College, Malta. After completing his secondary education, he studied at the Royal University of Malta, where he received his BSc in 1943. In 1943 he was awarded a Rhodes Scholarship to the University of Oxford but WW II prevented him from utilizing the Rhodes Scholarship. During WW II, Gilles served from 1940 to 1944 as an officer/cadet in the Royal Malta Artillery; during the Siege of Malta, he manned one of the anti-aircraft batteries. He qualified at the Royal University of Malta as MD in 1946. In 1948 he moved to England, where he, by means of his Rhodes Scholarship, received further education at the University of Oxford, qualifying MSc in 1951.

Career
He practised as a house physician at the Liverpool Royal Infirmary while he studied for a Diploma in Tropical Medicine at the Liverpool School of Tropical Medicine. From 1954 to 1958 he was in The Gambia working at a poorly equipped laboratory belonging to the UK Medical Research Council. Despite the rudimentary laboratory, Gilles and his supervisor Ian McGregor were able to do important research on antibodies to malaria.

At the University of Ibadan he met Adetokunbo Lucas, who worked with Gilles to create suitable teaching materials in tropical medicine. In 1965 Gilles returned to Liverpool as a senior lecturer at the Liverpool School of Tropical Medicine and was appointed there in 1970 a professor of tropical medicine, retiring as professor emeritus in 1986. In addition to his professorship, he was also dean to the Liverpool School of Tropical Medicine from 1978 to 1983. He was for a number of years a visiting professor at the University of Malta, travelling to Malta three times a year.

Gilles was the author or coauthor of several books and over 150 papers in scientific journals.

Personal life
He married Wilhelmina (Mina) Caruana on 2 February 1955. They had three sons and a daughter before Mina's death in 1972, in a car accident. He subsequently married Dr Mejra Kocic Dimitri, who died in 2009.

Awards and honours
 1969 — Fellow of the Royal College of Physicians
 1979 — honorary MD, Karolinska Institute
 1990 — World Health Organization Darling Foundation Medal and Prize
 1994 — Mary Kingsley Medal, Liverpool School of Tropical Medicine
 1997 — honorary fellow, Royal Society of Tropical Medicine and Hygiene
 1998 — honorary member, Swedish Society of Tropical Medicine
 1999 — honorary member, Italian Society of Tropical Medicine
 2003 — Malta’s National Order of Merit
 2005 — Companion of the Most Distinguished Order of St Michael and St George
 2006 — Knight of Malta (KSJ)
 2007 — Manson Medal, Royal Society of Tropical Medicine and Hygiene
 2008 — Companion of the Most Exalted Order of the White Elephant bestowed by the King of Thailand

References

1921 births
2015 deaths
Maltese emigrants to the United Kingdom
British public health doctors
British medical researchers
20th-century British medical doctors
21st-century British medical doctors
Companions of the Order of St Michael and St George
Fellows of the Royal College of Physicians
Manson medal winners
Malariologists
People from Port Said
Expatriates in Egypt
The Darling Foundation Prize laureates